"Pookie" is a song by Malian-French singer Aya Nakamura. It was released as a single on 10 April 2019.

Music video

The music video was released on 10 April, 2019 and was directed by the song's producer, Vladimir Boudnikoff. It was shot in the Gallery of Diana in the Palace of Fontainebleau. The video shows Aya Nakamura performing the vogue, a modern house dance originating in the 1980s. Some scenes are also shot in the Gallery of the Deers, Gallery of François I and in the Ballroom.

The music video had reached 100 million views in August 2019. It has over 269 million views.

Charts

Weekly charts

Year-end charts

Certifications

References

2019 songs
2019 singles
Aya Nakamura songs
French songs
Music video controversies
Songs written by Aya Nakamura